Paul McIntyre (born 24 November  1987) is a Scottish former footballer, who played for Ayr United, St Mirren, Stranraer, Clydebank in the Scottish Football League.

External links 

1967 births
Living people
People from Girvan
Association football midfielders
Scottish footballers
Ayr United F.C. players
St Mirren F.C. players
Stranraer F.C. players
Clydebank F.C. (1965) players
Partick Thistle F.C. players
Scottish Football League players
Footballers from South Ayrshire